Arsenura is a genus of moths in the family Saturniidae. The genus was erected by James Duncan and John O. Westwood in 1841.

Species
The genus includes the following species:

Arsenura albopicta Jordan, 1922
Arsenura alcmene Draudt, 1930
Arsenura altocymonia Brechlin & Meister, 2010
Arsenura amacymonia Brechlin & Meister, 2011
Arsenura angulata Bouvier, 1924
Arsenura arcaei Druce, 1886
Arsenura archianassa Draudt, 1930
Arsenura arianae Brechlin & Meister, 2010
Arsenura armida (Cramer, 1779)
Arsenura aspasia (Herrich-Schaeffer, 1853)
Arsenura aurantiaca Lemaire, 1976
Arsenura batesii (R. Felder & Rogenhofer, 1874)
Arsenura beebei (Fleming, 1945)
Arsenura biundulata Schaus, 1906
Arsenura ciocolatina Draudt, 1930
Arsenura columbiana Rothschild, 1907
Arsenura crenulata Schaus, 1921
Arsenura cymonia (W. Rothschild, 1907)
Arsenura delormei Bouvier, 1929
Arsenura drucei Schaus, 1906
Arsenura fuscata Brechlin & Meister, 2010
Arsenura hercules Walker, 1855
Arsenura jennettae Wolfe, Conlan & Kelly, 2000
Arsenura kaechi Brechlin & Meister, 2010
Arsenura meander (Walker, 1855)
Arsenura mestiza Draudt, 1940
Arsenura mossi Jordan, 1922
Arsenura niepelti Schüssler, 1930
Arsenura orbignyana (Guerin-Meneville, 1844)
Arsenura oweni Schaus, 1921
Arsenura pandora (Klug, 1836)
Arsenura paranensis Schüssler, 1930
Arsenura paraorbygnyana Brechlin & Meister, 2010
Arsenura peggyae Brechlin & Meister, 2013
Arsenura pelias Jordan, 1911
Arsenura polyodonta (Jordan, 1911)
Arsenura ponderosa W. Rothschild, 1895
Arsenura rebeli Gschwander, 1920
Arsenura sylla (Cramer, 1779)
Arsenura thomsoni Schaus, 1906
Arsenura xanthopus (Walker, 1855)
Arsenura yungascymonia Brechlin & Meister, 2010

External links

Arsenurinae
Moth genera